River Rhythms is a free outdoor music concert series, held Thursday evenings in July and August, at Monteith Riverpark along the Willamette and Calapooia Rivers in downtown Albany, Oregon.

History 
River Rhythms was started in 1984 and showcases a wide variety of musical entertainment. This event, along with the ATI Wah Chang Northwest Art & Air Festival, are two of Albany's signature events.

There were no concerts in 2020.

External links 
River Rhythms official web site

Culture of Albany, Oregon
Festivals in Oregon
Tourist attractions in Linn County, Oregon
1984 establishments in Oregon